MV TSgt John A. Chapman (T-AK-323) was a Buffalo Soldier-class container ship. She was one of Military Sealift Command's Prepositioning Program.

Built in 1978 by Chantier naval de La Ciotat in la Ciotat, France, she was originally named Merlin. On 8 April 2005, she was renamed for Pope Air Force Base combat controller Technical Sergeant John A. Chapman, a posthumous Air Force Cross recipient. He was awarded the Air Force Cross for his actions during the Battle of Takur Ghar. In 2018, Chapman's Air Force Cross was upgraded to the Medal of Honor.

TSgt John A. Chapman carried Air Force munitions. She featured climate-controlled cocoons on her weather decks which protect additional cargo from the marine environment. She was owned and operated by Sealift Incorporated under charter to MSC.

She was scrapped on 4 September 2014 at Alang.

See also
 Operation Anaconda

References

External links
 

Container ships of the United States Navy
Ships built in France
1977 ships
Merchant ships of France
Merchant ships of the United States